Grace Reformed Baptist Church is a Reformed Baptist church in Owensboro, Kentucky. The church has been worshipping together since 2015. It is affiliated with the Mid-America Reformed Baptist Association of Churches. Among the pastors of the congregation is Samuel E. Waldron who serves as the president of the Covenant Baptist Theological Seminary that meets on the church's grounds.

Pastors
 Ben Carlson (2018 - )
 Samuel E. Waldron (2015 - )
 Joe Wilson (2015 - )

References

Baptist
Kentucky
Churches
Churches in Owensboro, Kentucky